Live at Kings Place is the fifth solo album by folk musician and Idlewild vocalist Roddy Woomble, released in August 2014 as the 75th offering from the Society of Sound, a music subscription service provided by Bowers & Wilkins.

Track listing
 "A New Day Has Begun"
 "Every Line of a Long Moment"
 "Work Like You Can"
 "Between the Old Moon"
 "The Last One of My Kind"
 "Green Rocky Road"
 "Leaving Without Gold"
 "My Secret Is My Silence"
 "The Universe Is On My Side"
 "Fiddle Tunes"
 "Trouble Your Door"
 "Quiet Crown"
 "You Held the World in Your Arms"
 "Goodnight"
 "Speed of the Sound of Loneliness"
 "I Came in from the Mountain"
 "Waverley Steps"
 "Old Town"
 "Roll Along"

Personnel

Musicians
 Roddy Woomble - lead vocals
 Hannah Fisher - fiddle & vocals
 Sorren Maclean - acoustic guitar & vocals
 Luciano Rossi - piano
 Craig Ainslie - electric bass

References

Roddy Woomble albums
2014 live albums